Dan I may refer to:

 Dan I of Wallachia, reigned c. 1383 – 1386
 Dan I of Denmark,  progenitor of the Danish royal house 
 Dan-I - Disco one hit wonder from 1979